Leigh Cell was a monastery in Devon, England.

References

Monasteries in Devon